Stumfilm (Silent Movie) is an EP by bob hund, released in 2010. The first and only single was "Festen Är Över" for which a music video directed by Jens Klevje & Fabian Svensson was created.

Track listing
All songs written by Bob Hund:
"Leker Krig " – 3:20 ("Playing War")
"Festen Är Över" – 4:38 ("The party is over")
"Omringad Av Hjälp" – 5:48 ("Surrounded by help")
"Lögndetektorn" – 4:28 ("The lie Detector")

2010 EPs
Bob Hund albums